Ústí nad Labem main station is a railway station in the city of Ústí nad Labem in the Ústí nad Labem Region of the Czech Republic. The station opened in 1850 and is located on the Praha–Ústí nad Labem–Děčín railway, Ústí nad Labem–Chomutov railway and Ústí nad Labem–Bílina railway. The train services are operated by České dráhy.

References

External links

Railway stations in Ústí nad Labem Region
hlavní nádraží
Railway stations opened in 1850
Railway stations in the Czech Republic opened in 1850